Beacon of Hope may refer to:
 A Beacon of Hope, a 1963 United States report on cultural exchange programs
 Beacon of Hope (sculpture), in Belfast, by Andy Scott
 Beacon of Hope (monument) in Stiles Circle Park, Oklahoma City
 Beacon of Hope, a sculpture in Sackville Gardens, Manchester, England
 Beacon of Hope, an album by Sea Scouts
 "Beacon of Hope" (Arrow), an episode of Arrow